The Maine Edge is an 18,000+ circulation free weekly lifestyle/cultural arts publication distributed by Edge Media Group in Bangor, Maine.

History and format
The Edge, as it's commonly called by readers, was created in part due to the loss of readership among young people in the Bangor area, a problem afflicting many major newspapers across the country. Similar to publications including RedEye in Chicago and Quick (newspaper) in Dallas, the publishers began The Edge in an effort to pull readers back into readership and serve a niche not being serviced by other media in the area.

The Edge appeared in December 2006 after the daily newspaper in Bangor, the Bangor Daily News, suffered a series of cutbacks in personnel. Citing declining advertising revenue, the BDN, as it's referred to locally, cut a series of positions in the editorial department and closed several bureaus.

As compared with mainstream newspapers, The Edge strongly emphasizes pop culture and entertainment news; humorous or lighthearted rather than serious columns, and flashy graphics and large pictures. It is a tabloid-format newspaper, oriented vertically rather than horizontally and with a front page consisting only of a large picture and several headlines.

The Edge publishes each Wednesday, and is a member of The Associated Press and the New England Press Association.

See also
 WLBZ
 Journalism
 Mass media
 Newspaper

Notes and references

External links
The Maine Edge Online

Culture of Bangor, Maine
Newspapers published in Maine
Mass media in Bangor, Maine
Companies based in Bangor, Maine